Gokula Krishnan was an Indian film director, who has directed Tamil films. He was primarily active in the 1980s and early 1990s and is most noted for his work on films featuring actor Karthik. He also extensively worked with Malayalam director Fazil and other Malayalam directors, when they made Tamil films, helping write dialogues.

Career
Gokula Krishnan made his directorial debut in the early 1980s, before choosing to prioritise his work as a script-writer to Malayalam director Fazil, when he made Tamil films. In the mid 1990s, Gokula Krishnan made three consecutive films with actor Karthik. Muthu Kaalai (1995), Poovarasan (1996) and Udhavikku Varalaamaa (1998) all fared poorly at the box office.

He died after a brief illness on 28 October 2008, leaving behind his wife, Kavitha.

Filmography

As director

As writer only
Poove Poochooda Vaa (1985)
Karimedu Karuvayan (1986)
Poovizhi Vasalile (1987)
En Bommukutty Ammavukku (1988)
Varusham Padhinaaru (1989)
Arangetra Velai (1990)
Gopura Vasalile (1991)
Karpoora Mullai (1991)
Kilipetchu Ketkava (1993)
Ponnumani (1993)
Ejamaan (1993)
Narasimha Naicker (1994)
Rajakumaran (1994)
Nandhavana Theru (1995)
Kadhalukku Mariyadhai (1997)
Time (1999)
Kannukkul Nilavu (2000)
Friends (2001)
Kanden Seethaiyai (2001)
Kasi (2001)
En Mana Vaanil (2002)
Magic Magic 3D (2003)
Engal Anna (2004)
4 Students (2004)
Oru Naal Oru Kanavu (2005)
Sadhu Miranda (2008)

References

External links

Indian film directors
Tamil film directors
Indian male screenwriters
Tamil screenwriters
Film directors from Tamil Nadu
2008 deaths
People from Tirunelveli district
20th-century Indian film directors
1945 births
20th-century Indian screenwriters
20th-century Indian male writers